Mineros de Zacatecas (English: Zacatecas Miners) is a Mexican professional basketball team, based in Zacatecas City, Zacatecas. The Mineros are part of the Liga Nacional de Baloncesto Profesional, the top professional basketball league in Mexico. The team plays its home games at the Gimnasio Profesor Marcelino González, with a capacity of 4,138 spectators.

History
The franchise was originally founded in 2001 as Barreteros de Zacatecas and started playing in Liga Nacional de Baloncesto Profesional in 2004. In 2017, the team was purchased by the Government of the State of Zacatecas for 2.5 million pesos (around US$130,000) and rebranded as Mineros for the 2018–17 season.

The team's name, colors and logo are very similar to the football club Mineros de Zacatecas of the Ascenso MX, the second level of Mexican football.

Players

Current roster

References

External links 
 Official website 
 Team profile 

Basketball teams in Mexico
Basketball teams established in 2017
2017 establishments in Mexico
Sport in Zacatecas
Zacatecas City